The 6th Central Committee of the Communist Party of Cuba (CPC) was elected at the 6th CPC Congress in 2011.

Members

References

6th Central Committee of the Communist Party of Cuba
2011 establishments in Cuba
2016 disestablishments in Cuba